The Mogotes de Jumagua are a set of eight elevated limestone features in the Villa Clara Province of Cuba. They are located within the orographic group Heights of the Northwest in the center-north of the island of Cuba, two kilometers south-west from the city of Sagua la Grande.

The pinnacles are of Upper Cretaceous age and are fused to each other, presenting enormous caverns. They have great scientific interest due to the enormous concentration of flora and fauna in a relatively reduced area, forming an ecological small island. Species in the area are vestige of the old primitive Cuban gold coast forests.

History 
Jumagua's Mogotes were not studied scientifically at all before 1970; that year marked the beginning of what can probably be considered one of the most important success stories for Cuban naturalists and nature lovers. Never before had Jumagua hills been studied scientifically and until that moment they were no apparent interest, so using them as limestone mines was considered a viable economic use. Because the site was only visited by sporadic students or some curious traveler usually looking for gold (according to local legend a pirate hid his treasure in the hills and never came back to claim it) no definition as wildlife refugee, archaeological or speleological site, or any ecological importance was attached to it.

In the 1970s, however, Sabaneque Speleological Group from Sagua la Grande starts the production of a cartographic map of the region along with a flora and fauna catalog of the caverns in the mogotes. They discovered that the small caves were actually subterranean developed system of caverns with lakes and rivers. Numerous rare endemic animals were also discovered, among them a unique scorpion. Not many species of scorpions live in Cuba, local farmers used to say they have spotted a different kind of scorpion that only lived in the Mogotes and the research of the scientist proved true this fable. Also discovered; giant fisher bat colonies, cave tortoises, blind fishes and crabs, and the American ell Anguilla rostrata. In the case of the ells is also an impressive example of adaptation since this species usually live in the ocean, they move into rivers and lakes only to give birth. Fossils like the disappeared snail Pseudomiltha sp. and a giant rodent (Megalocnus rodens) that once roam Cuban forests were also uncovered. The Megalocnus is so big that is used to be described by paleontologists as the Cuban bear. Last but not least bones and other proof that Cuban indigenous people lived in the area prior to the Spanish conquest.

But the most important species ever re-discovered belongs to the plant kingdom; the forgotten Palmitas de Jumagua (literally Jumagua's little palms) Hemithrinax ekmaniana a thrinax endemic to these hills and unique in the world.

As results of these investigations not only the first maps of its caverns were produced, also the first flora and fauna catalog was made by Sabaneque Speleological group of the whole forest in the mogotes and after claiming one of the most important archaeological sites of the region this little mountains were turn into a Natural Park and saved for future generations.

Local legends 

In Afro-Cuban mythology, the "Mother of Waters" is a half-serpent, half-woman creature that lives in rivers and ponds and sometimes drowns people and cattle in the depths of her realm. The sons of the Mother of Waters, the "Guijes", are dwarf black children who also live in ponds surrounded by jungle and play pranks on travelers. Jumagua's Mogotes——like every small wild place in Cuba——is no different, and has been attached over centuries with one of the biggest mothers of waters ever seen. Farmers in the 19th century and the beginning of the 20th century claim to have seen her or her tracks in the dirt. Since the legend of the scorpion turns out to be true, finding a rather big snake in the caverns was one of the purposes of Sabaneque Group. There are few big snakes in Cuba, but the premise on which the group bases its research to prove this theory supposes that a visitor traveling from overseas might have brought an anaconda (or similar snake), since they are very small in juvenile age, that grew up after in the area using the caves as shelter. But so far they have never found any bones or skin to prove that a snake has ever been in the hills.

Another colorful story involves pirates. According to the story, one day a Captain with part of his crew disembarked by the Isabella coast and hid a treasure in the mogotes. Heading back to the coast he noticed his second in command was missing, maybe lost, but very soon the captain, a very smart guy, understood that the second officer actually stayed behind in order to steal the treasure for himself. A shoot-out developed between the pirates and bandits (probably the XO himself) and the pirates had to head back to the coast empty handed. This story, true or not, has inspired many locals to go and try their luck in the hills searching for the lost gold.

Historically, what is fact is that all the caves have been camping places for runaway slaves during the colonial period and for mambi warriors of the "Sagua Brigade" during the independence war of 1895.

References

External links
Mogotes de Junagua, Explorations
Mogotes de Junagua, Faune

Landforms of Cuba
Nature reserves in Cuba
Sagua la Grande
Geography of Villa Clara Province